Ctenolita argyrobapta is a moth species in the family of Limacodidae found in Cameroon and in Ghana. The type provided from Bipindé, southern Cameroon.

This species has a wingspan of 38mm.

References

External links

Limacodidae
Moths of Africa
Moths described in 1899